Martin Persson (13 October 1886 – 13 February 1918) was a Swedish track and field athlete who competed in the 1912 Summer Olympics.

In 1912 he was qualified for the final of the 10000 metres event but did not participate in the race. In the 5000 metres competition he was eliminated in the first round.

References

External links
profile

1886 births
1918 deaths
Swedish male long-distance runners
Olympic athletes of Sweden
Athletes (track and field) at the 1912 Summer Olympics